Devlin Barnes (born 18 April 1982 in Seoul, South Korea) is an American soccer defender who last played for USL Second Division side Real Maryland Monarchs.

Barnes attended the University of Massachusetts Amherst, playing on the men's soccer team from 2000 to 2003.  In 2003, he signed with the Albany Blackwatch Highlanders of the fourth division Premier Development League.  In 2005, he joined the Pittsburgh Riverhounds of the USL Second Division, making 13 appearances and scoring one goal before ending the season with the Atlanta Silverbacks of the USL First Division.  In 2006, he moved to the Wilmington Hammerheads of USL-1.  In 2008, he signed with his current team, Real Maryland.

After retiring in 2009, Barnes switched to full-time personal training at various gyms and privately in the Washington, D.C. region. He and his wife Barbara have two children.

References

External links
Profile at umassathletics.com

Living people
Albany BWP Highlanders players
American soccer players
Atlanta Silverbacks players
Association football defenders
People from Washington, D.C.
Pittsburgh Riverhounds SC players
Real Maryland F.C. players
Soccer players from Washington, D.C.
University of Massachusetts Amherst alumni
USL Second Division players
USL League Two players
Wilmington Hammerheads FC players
1982 births